Merloni is a surname. One of the families bearing this surname is an Italian family, dealing with business. Persons with that name include:

 Aristide Merloni (1897–1970), Italian businessman, founder of the Merloni industries
 Clelia Merloni (1861–1930), Italian Roman Catholic professed religious and the founder of the Apostles of the Sacred Heart of Jesus
 Francesco Merloni (born 1925), Italian businessman and politician
 Lou Merloni (born 1971), American radio personality and baseball player
 Pete Merloni (1904–1967), American professional football player
 Vittorio Merloni (1933–2016), Italian businessman

See also
Ariston Thermo, founded as Industrie Merloni

References

Italian-language surnames
Italian words and phrases